Manual communication systems use articulation of the hands (hand signs, gestures, etc.) to mediate a message between persons. Being expressed manually, they are received visually and sometimes tactually. When it is the primary form of communication, it may be enhanced by body language and facial expressions.

Manual communication is employed in sign languages and manually coded languages, though sign languages also possess non-manual elements. Other systems of manual communication have been developed for specific purposes, typically in situations where speech is not practical (such as loud environments) or permitted, or where secrecy is desired.

Examples 
 Charades
 Diving signals — hand communication methods while scuba diving
 Flag semaphores — telegraphy systems using hand-held flags, other objects, or the hands themselves
 Finger counting
 Chinese number gestures
 Open outcry hand signaling
 Fingerspelling or manual alphabets
 Gang signals — signs used to signify allegiance to a gang or local gang branches
 Hand signals in traffic
 Monastic sign languages — symbolic gestural communication used by monastic communities
 Rueda de Casino — a dance that uses hand motions to "call" other dancers
 Tic-tac — a traditional method of hand signs used by bookmakers in horse racing
 U.S. Army hand and arm signals

External links
 ASL Resource Site Free online lessons, ASL dictionary, and resources for teachers, students, and parents.

Human communication
Gestures